This Is the Way may refer to:

 This Is the Way (album), by The Rossington-Collins Band
 "This Is the Way" (Dannii Minogue song), 1993
 "This Is the Way" (E-Type song), 1994
 Here We Go Round the Mulberry Bush, a children's nursery rhyme